Thomas Jacobsen may refer to:

Thomas Jacobsen (sailor) (born 1972), Danish sailor and Olympic champion
Thomas Jacobsen (footballer) (born 1983), Norwegian footballer
Thomas Jacobsen (sledge hockey) (born 1987), Norwegian ice sledge hockey player
Thomas Jacobsen (violin maker), Danish violin maker
Thomas Owen Jacobsen (1864–1941), British businessman and Liberal politician

See also
Thomas Jakobsen, mathematician, cryptographer, and computer programmer
Thomas Holm Jakobsen, Danish sprint canoer